Platysphinx bouyeri is a moth of the  family Sphingidae. It is known from Guinea, Burkina Faso and the Central African Republic.

References

Platysphinx
Moths described in 2004